Themira putris is a European species of fly and member of the family Sepsidae.

References

Sepsidae
Muscomorph flies of Europe
Flies described in 1758
Taxa named by Carl Linnaeus